Mala Usora (English: Little Usora) is a river in central-northern Bosnia and Herzegovina. At its confluence with the Velika Usora River, at Teslić, it creates the Usora River.

Rivers of Bosnia and Herzegovina
Landforms of the Federation of Bosnia and Herzegovina
Landforms of Republika Srpska
Teslić

References